= Kalker Friedhof =

Cemetery in Cologne, Germany

Coordinates: 50°56′47″N 7°02′36″E

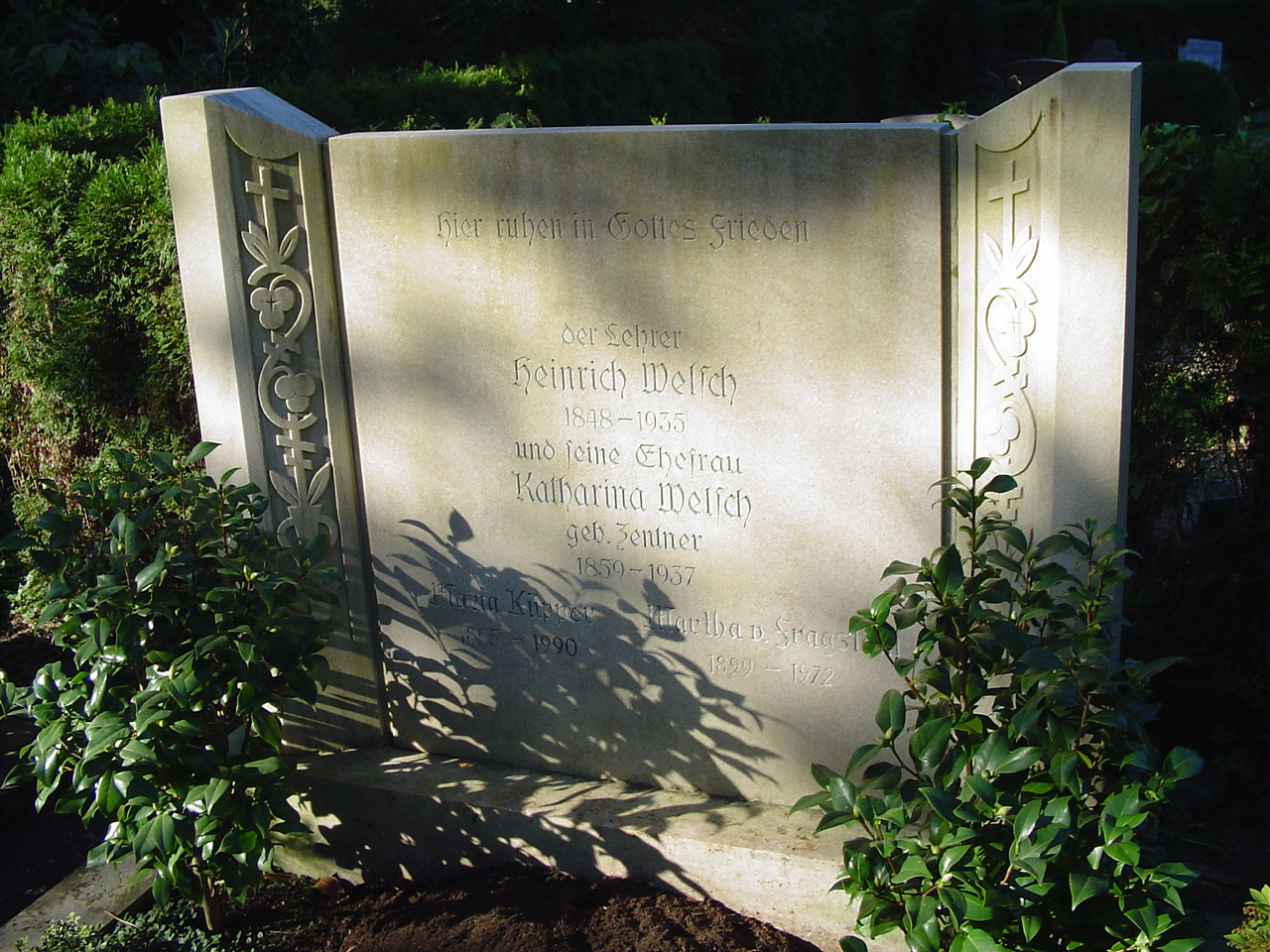

Kalker Friedhof is an urban cemetery in Cologne, Germany in the district of Merheim. The cemetery was established in 1904.

In the 1960s, the cemetery was expanded to its current size of about 15.4 hectares.
